Balbaşı is a village in the Sason District, Batman Province, Turkey. The village is populated by Kurds of the Xiyan tribe and had a population of 142 in 2021.

The hamlet of Pazarcık is attached to the village.

References 

Villages in Sason District
Kurdish settlements in Batman Province